The 1978 Karnataka State Legislative Assembly election was held in the Indian state of Karnataka to elect 224 members of the Karnataka Legislative Assembly. Riding on the popularity of the various social welfare measures initiated by Chief minister Devaraj Urs, the Congress-I emerged victorious winning 149 seats.

Results

!colspan=10|
|- align=center
!style="background-color:#E9E9E9" class="unsortable"|
!style="background-color:#E9E9E9" align=center|Political Party
!style="background-color:#E9E9E9" |Contestants
!style="background-color:#E9E9E9" |Seats won
!style="background-color:#E9E9E9" |Seat change
!style="background-color:#E9E9E9" |Number of votes
!style="background-color:#E9E9E9" |Vote share
|- style="background: #90EE90;"
| 
|align="left"|Indian National Congress (Indira)||214||149|| 16||5,543,756||44.25%| 7.92%
|-
| 
|align="left"|Janata Party||222||59|| 59||4,754,114||37.95%| 37.95%
|-
| 
|align="left"|Communist Party of India||6||3||||148,567||1.19%| 0.20%
|-
| 
|align="left"|Indian National Congress (Organisation)||212||2|| 22||1,001,553||7.99%| 18.23%
|-
| 
|align="left"|Republican Party of India||3||1|| 1||22,443||0.18%| 0.18%
|-
| 
|align="left"|Independents||||10|| 10||940,677||7.51%|N/A
|-
|
|align="left"|Total||||224||||''''''||
|-
|}

Elected members

References

Karnataka
State Assembly elections in Karnataka
1970s in Karnataka